Huntington Beach is a seaside city in Orange County in Southern California, United States. The city is named after American businessman Henry E. Huntington. The population was 198,711 during the 2020 census, making it the fourth most populous city in Orange County, the most populous beach city in Orange County, and the seventh most populous city in the Los Angeles-Long Beach-Anaheim, CA Metropolitan Statistical Area.

Huntington Beach is known for its long  stretch of sandy beach, mild climate, excellent surfing, and beach culture. Swells generated predominantly from the North Pacific in winter and from a combination of Southern Hemisphere storms and hurricanes in the summer focus on Huntington Beach, creating consistent surf all year long, hence the nickname "Surf City".

History

The Tongva village of Lupukngna was located in what is now Huntington Beach, with an approximate location being near the Newland House Museum. The nearby village of Genga, shared with the Acjachemen, was located across the Santa Ana River in what is now Newport Beach and Costa Mesa.

The main thoroughfare of Huntington Beach, Beach Boulevard, was originally a cattle route for the main industry of the Rancho. Since its time as a parcel of the enormous Spanish land grant, Huntington Beach has undergone many incarnations. One time it was known as Shell Beach, the town of Smeltzer, and then Gospel Swamp for the revival meetings that were held in the marshland where the community college Golden West College can currently be found. Later it became known as Fairview and then Pacific City, as it developed into a tourist destination. In order to secure access to the Pacific Electric Red Car lines that used to criss-cross Los Angeles and ended in Long Beach, Pacific City ceded enormous power to railroad magnate Henry E. Huntington, and thus became a city whose name has been written into corporate sponsorship, and like much of the history of Southern California, boosterism.

The original Huntington Beach Pier was built in 1904 and was originally a 1,000-foot-long timber structure. Huntington Beach was incorporated on February 17, 1909, during the tenure of its first mayor, Ed Manning. Its original developer was Huntington Beach Company (formerly the West Coast Land and Water Company), a real-estate development firm owned by Henry Huntington. The Huntington Beach Company is still a major land-owner in the city, and still owns most of the local mineral rights. The company is now wholly owned by the Chevron Corporation.

At one time, an encyclopedia company gave away free parcels of land (with the purchase of a whole set for $126) in the Huntington Beach area. The lucky buyers got more than they had bargained for when oil was discovered in the area, and enormous development of the oil reserves followed. Though many of the old reserves are depleted, and the price of land for housing has pushed many of the rigs off the landscape, oil pumps can still be found to dot the city.

Huntington Beach was primarily agricultural in its early years with crops such as lima beans, asparagus, peppers, celery and sugar beets. Holly Sugar was a major employer with a large processing plant in the city that was later converted into an oil refinery.

The city's first high school, Huntington Beach High School, located on Main Street, was built in 1906. The school's team, the Oilers, is named after the city's original natural resource.

Meadowlark Airport, a small general-aviation airport, existed in Huntington Beach from the 1940s until 1989.

Huntington Beach Speedway, a racetrack designed for midget car racing, existed from 1946 until 1958.

Geography

The entire city of Huntington Beach lies in area codes 714 and 657, except for small parts of Huntington Harbour (along with Sunset Beach, the community adjacent to Huntington Harbour), which is in the 562 area code.

Climate
Huntington Beach has a borderline semi-arid/Mediterranean climate (Köppen climate classification: BSk/Csb), gradually changing for the second to the west and south due to its low precipitation. Although areas such as Huntington Central Park and northern Bolsa Chica usually fall into the first climate type, thus being the boundary of the cool summer Mediterranean climate on the west coast of North America, except for elevated portions in the southern end of the state. The climate is generally sunny, dry and cool, although evenings can be excessively damp. In the morning and evening, there are often strong breezes that can reach . In the summer, temperatures rarely exceed . In the winter, temperatures rarely fall below , even on clear nights. Frost occurs only rarely, on the coldest winter nights. The area is annually affected by a marine layer caused by the cool air of the Pacific Ocean meeting the warm air over the land. This results in overcast and foggy conditions in May and June.

Natural resources
Construction of any kind on the beach is prohibited without a vote by current homeowners.

Between Downtown Huntington Beach and Huntington Harbour lies a large marshy wetland, much of which is protected within the Bolsa Chica Ecological Reserve. A $110 million restoration of the wetlands was completed in 2006. The reserve is popular with bird watchers and photographers.

South of Downtown, the Talbert, Brookhurst and Magnolia Marshes, which lie across the street from Huntington State Beach, had restoration completed in 2010.

The northern and southern beaches (Bolsa Chica State Beach and Huntington State Beach, respectively) are state parks. Only the central beach (Huntington City Beach) is maintained by the city. Camping and RVs are permitted here, and popular campsites for the Fourth of July and the Surfing Championships must be reserved many months in advance. Bolsa Chica State Beach is actually a sand bar fronting the Bolsa Bay and Bolsa Chica State Ecological Reserve.

It is suitable for light craft, and includes a marina, launching ramp, basic services, a picnic area and a few restaurants. The park is in Seal Beach, but is only reachable from Huntington Harbour. The Sunset/Huntington Harbour area is patrolled by the Orange County Sheriff's Harbor Patrol.

The harbor entrance for Anaheim Bay is sometimes restricted by the United States Navy, which loads ships with munitions at the Seal Beach Naval Weapons Station to the north of the main channel.

Demographics

2020 
The 2020 United States census reported that Huntington Beach had a population of 198,711. The racial makeup of Huntington Beach was 126,591 (63.7%) White, 2,291 (1.2%) African American, 1,293 (0.7%) Native American, 26,346 (13.2%) Asian, 603 (0.3%) Pacific Islander, 15,689 (7.9%) from other races, and 25,898 (13.0%) from two or more races. There were 39,457 Hispanic or Latino residents of any race (19.9%). Non-Hispanic Whites were 61.3% of the population.

2010
The 2010 United States Census reported that Huntington Beach had a population of 189,992. The racial makeup of Huntington Beach was 145,661 (76.7%) White, 1,813 (1.0%) African American, 992 (0.5%) Native American, 21,070 (11.1%) Asian, 635 (0.3%) Pacific Islander, 11,193 (5.9%) from other races, and 8,628 (4.5%) from two or more races. There were 32,411 Hispanic or Latino residents of any race (17.1%). Non-Hispanic Whites were 67.2% of the population.

The Census reported that 189,102 people (99.5% of the population) lived in households, 487 (0.3%) lived in non-institutionalized group quarters, and 403 (0.2%) were institutionalized.

There were 74,285 households, out of which 21,922 (29.5%) had children under the age of 18 living in them, 36,729 (49.4%) were opposite-sex married couples living together, 7,685 (10.3%) had a female householder with no husband present, 3,804 (5.1%) had a male householder with no wife present. There were 4,386 (5.9%) unmarried opposite-sex partnerships, and 504 (0.7%) same-sex married couples or partnerships. 18,489 households (24.9%) were made up of individuals, and 6,527 (8.8%) had someone living alone who was 65 years of age or older. The average household size was 2.55. There were 48,218 families (64.9% of all households); the average family size was 3.07.

There were 39,128 people (20.6%) under the age of 18, 15,906 people (8.4%) aged 18 to 24, 54,024 people (28.4%) aged 25 to 44, 53,978 people (28.4%) aged 45 to 64, and 26,956 people (14.2%) who were 65 years of age or older. The median age was 40.2 years. For every 100 females, there were 98.5 males. For every 100 females age 18 and over, there were 96.6 males.

The homeowner vacancy rate was 1.1%; the rental vacancy rate was 5.4%. 115,470 people (60.8% of the population) lived in owner-occupied housing units and 73,632 people (38.8%) lived in rental housing units.

During 20092013, Huntington Beach had a median household income of $81,389, with 8.9% of the population living below the federal poverty line.

2000

At the 2000 census, the population density was 7,183.6 inhabitants per square mile (2,773.9/km2). The racial makeup of the city was 79.2% White, 0.8% Black or African American, 0.7% Native American, 9.3% Asian, 0.2% Pacific Islander, 5.8% from other races, and 3.9% from two or more races. 14.7% of the population were Hispanic or Latino of any race.

There were 73,657 households, out of which 29.0% had children under the age of 18 living with them, 50.7% were married couples living together, 9.6% had a female householder with no husband present, and 35.2% were non-families. 24.3% of all households were made up of individuals, and 6.7% had someone living alone who was 65 years of age or older. The average household size was 2.56 and the average family size was 3.08.

In the city, 22.2% of the population was under the age of 18, 8.4% was from 18 to 24, 34.9% from 25 to 44, 24.0% from 45 to 64, and 10.4% who were 65 years of age or older. The median age was 36 years. For every 100 females, there were 100.4 males. For every 100 females age 18 and over, there were 98.6 males.

The median income for a household in the city was $76,527, and the median income for a family was $94,597. Adult males had a median income of $50,021 versus $33,041 for adult females. The per capita income for the city was $40,183. About 5.1% of families and 7.8% of the population were below the poverty line, including 11.2% of those under age 18 and 4.4% of those age 65 or over.

Economy

Oil
Huntington Beach sits above a large natural fault structure containing a critical supply of natural oil.

Huntington Beach has an off-shore oil terminus for the tankers that support the Alaska Pipeline. The terminus pipes run inland to a refinery in Santa Fe Springs. Huntington Beach also has the Gothard–Talbert terminus for the Orange County portion of the pipeline running from the Chevron El Segundo refinery.

Environmental impact of oil drilling

On October 3, 2021, an oil spill was reported where, "Officials warned of a potential ecological disaster after more than 120,000 gallons of oil leaked from an offshore rig and began washing up on beaches in Southern California as workers tried to contain the spill. The leak was reported Saturday afternoon, with the U.S. Coast Guard stating that the slick was about three miles off Newport Beach... Katrina Foley, an Orange County supervisor, tweeted that the oil spilled from Platform Elly, operated by Beta Offshore, a Long Beach unit of Houston’s Amplify Energy." Reports of tidal wetlands have been damaged, "The spill had reached the Talbert Marsh and some environmentally sensitive wetlands areas by Sunday morning. It will take time to know the extent of the damage but officials said some birds and fish have been found dead. Huntington State Beach is home to a number of species of birds, including gulls, willet, long-billed fletcher, elegant teens and reddish egret, which are rare on the West Coast, according to Ben Smith, a biologist and environmental consultant for the county."

Other
The city is discussing closing off Main Street to cars from PCH through the retail shopping and restaurant areas, making it a pedestrian-only zone. Other shopping centers include Bella Terra, built on the former Huntington Center site, Pacific City, and Old World Village, a German-themed center.

Several hotels have been constructed on the inland side of PCH within view of the beach, just southeast of the pier.

Huntington Beach contains a small industrial district in its northwest corner, near the borders with Westminster and Seal Beach.

Huntington Beach contains a major installation of Boeing, formerly McDonnell-Douglas. A number of installations on the Boeing campus were originally constructed to service the Apollo Program, most notably the production of the S-IVB upper stage for the Saturn IB and Saturn V rockets.

Surf City USA trademarks

While Huntington Beach retains its 15-year trademark of Surf City Huntington Beach, the Huntington Beach Conference and Visitors Bureau filed four applications to register the "Surf City USA" trademark in November 2004. The idea was to market the city by creating an authentic brand based on Southern California's beach culture and active outdoor lifestyle while at the same time creating a family of product licensees who operate like a franchise family producing a revenue stream that could also be dedicated to promoting the brand and city. A ruling by the U.S. Patent and Trademark Office released on May 12, 2006, awarded three trademark registrations to the Bureau; nine additional trademark registrations have been granted since this time and ten other Surf City USA trademarks are now under consideration. One of the first products the Bureau developed to promote its brand was the Surf City USA Beach Cruiser by Felt Bicycles in 2006. The product has sold out every year in markets worldwide and created demand for a second rental bicycle model that will be marketed to resort locations across the globe starting in 2009. The Bureau now has dozens of other licensed products on the market from Surf City USA soft drinks to clothing to glassware. As of April 2008, the Bureau had more than 20 licensing partners with over 50 different products being prepared to enter the market over the next 18 months. Four of the Bureau's registrations of the trademark are now on the principal register and the remaining ten trademark applications are expected to follow. The Bureau is actively considering registration of the Surf City USA trademark in several different countries and anticipates a growing market for its branded products overseas in coming years.

An ongoing dispute between Huntington Beach and Santa Cruz, California over the trademark garnered national publicity in 2007 when a law firm representing Huntington Beach sent a cease-and-desist letter to a Santa Cruz T-shirt vendor. A settlement was reached in January 2008, which allows the Huntington Beach Conference and Visitors Bureau to retain the trademark.

Tourism

The downtown district includes an active art center, a colorful shopping district, and the International Surfing Museum.

This district was also the home of the Golden Bear from 1929 to 1986. Originally a fine dining restaurant opened by Harry Bakre in 1929, the Golden Bear became a nightclub in 1963 and hosted famous-name entertainment until it was demolished in 1986. The list of artists who performed there includes BB King, Janis Joplin, Jerry Garcia, Merl Saunders, Steve Martin, Charles Bukowski, The Ramones and Stevie Ray Vaughan.  The Huntington Beach Pier stretches from Main Street into the Pacific Ocean.  The popular End Cafe located at the end of the pier, was destroyed during a storm in 1983, and was rebuilt and reopened on Sept 20, 1985.  The End Cafe closed in 1988 when another storm destroyed the end of the pier. A Ruby's Diner was at the location from 1996 until 2021. Today the location is occupied by Bud & Gene's, a casual pop-up seafood restaurant that opened in July 2022.

Huntington Beach is home to the Newland House Museum, Huntington Beach's oldest home built in 1898.

Top employers
According to Huntington Beach's 2021 Annual Comprehensive Financial Report, the principal private employers in the city are:

BJ's Restaurant & Brewery is also based in Huntington Beach.

Arts and culture

Special events
Many of the events at Huntington Beach take place on the beach during the summer. The U.S. Open of Surfing is featured on the south side of the pier. Huntington Beach is a stop on the AVP beach volleyball tour. A biathlon (swim/run) hosted by the Bolsa Chica & Huntington State Beach Lifeguards takes place in July, early at dawn. The race begins at the Santa Ana River Jetties and ends at Warner Avenue, Bolsa Chica State Beach. Huntington Beach Junior Lifeguard day camps are held which teaches pre-adolescents and adolescents ocean swimming, running, and first-aid medical knowledge.

In addition to the beach-focused events, the Fourth of July parade has been held since 1904. The Huntington Beach Film Festival takes place every February.

The Pacific Airshow (originally known as the Breitling Huntington Beach Airshow, then the Great Pacific Airshow), featuring the Breitling Jet Team and the United States Air Force Thunderbirds, is held each October.

During the winter, the annual Cruise of Lights Boat Tour is held in the Huntington Harbour neighborhood. This is a parade of colorful lighted boats as well as boat tours to view the decorated homes. In February of each year since 1996, the Surf City USA marathon is held with over 20,000 runners. The annual Kite Festival is held just north of the pier in late February.

Huntington Beach hosts car shows such as the Beachcruiser Meet and a Concours d'Elegance. The Beachcruiser Meet is held in March, attracting over 250 classic cars displayed along Main Street and the Pier parking lot. A Concours d'Elegance is held at Central Park in June and benefits the public library. An informal "Donut Derelicts" car show occurs every Saturday morning at the intersection of Adams and Magnolia Street.  A Cars and Coffee car meet is held each Sunday morning at Pacific City.

Surf City Nights is held every Tuesday night during the year. The Tuesday Surf City Nights is a community-spirited event that features a farmer's market, unique entertainment, food, kiddie rides and a carnival atmosphere. Surf City Nights and the Downtown Huntington Beach Art Walk are presented by the Huntington Beach Downtown Business Improvement District (HBDBID) and the City of Huntington Beach. The Tuesday night Surf City Nights event takes place in the first three blocks of Main Street from Pacific Coast Highway to Orange Avenue.

Sports

Huntington Beach is the site of the world surfing championships, held annually in the summer. The city is often referred to as "Surf City" because of this high-profile event, its history and culture of surfing. It is often called the "Surfing Capital of the World", not for the height of the waves, but rather for the consistent quality of surf.

Huntington Beach was the host city of the National Professional Paintball League Super 7 Paintball Championships until the league shutdown in 2013.

Surf and beaches
George Freeth was the first person to surf in Huntington Beach with a demonstration on June 20, 1914. Freeth had been demonstrating surfing in southern California as a promotion for the city by Henry E. Huntington. Duke Kahanamoku started surfing in Huntington Beach in 1925 and helped popularize the sport. The first surfboard shop, which was located underneath the Huntington Beach Pier, opened in 1956 by Gordie Duane.

Apart from sponsored surf events, Huntington Beach has some of the best surf breaks in the State of California and that of the United States. Huntington Beach has four different facing beaches: Northwest, West, Southwest, and South. South consists in everything south of the pier which primarily focuses on Huntington State Beach (2.2 Miles), which almost faces true South.

Bolsa Chica State Beach is operated by the California Department of Parks and Recreation and the Bolsa Chica State Beach Lifeguards. The beach is very narrow and the sand is very coarse. Bolsa Chica tends to have better surf with NW/W swells during the winter season. During the summer months the beach picks up south/southwest swells at a very steep angle. Due to the bottom of the beach, surf at Bolsa Chica tends to be slowed down and refined to soft shoulders. Longboards are the best option for surfing in the Bolsa Chica area.

"The Cliffs" or "Dog Beach" is also another popular surf spot. This segment of Huntington Beach is so named because dogs are allowed around the cliff area. Beach is very restricted and often is submerged with high tides. Surf at this location tends to be even bigger than Bolsa Chica during the winter and often better. During the summer most of the South/Southwest swells slide right by and often break poorly. The best option is to take out a longboard, but shortboards will do at times. Dolphins have also been sighted in this area.

Just north and south of the Huntington Beach Pier are some well defined sandbars that shift throughout the year with the different swells. Southside of the Pier is often a popular destination during the summer for good surf, but the Northside can be just as well during the winter. Around the Pier it all depends on the swell and the sandbars. Shortboard is your best option for surfing around the Pier.

South Huntington Beach, also known as Huntington State Beach, is where all the south swells impact the coastline. Huntington State Beach is operated by the State of California, Department of Parks & Recreation, and Huntington State Beach Lifeguards. This beach is very wide with plenty of sand. Sandbars dramatically shift during the spring, summer and fall seasons, thus creating excellent surf conditions with a combination South/West/Northwest swell. Due to the Santa Ana River jetties located at the southernmost end of the beach, large sandbars extend across and upcoast, forcing swells to break extremely fast and hollow. Best seasons for surfing at this beach is the summer and fall. The best option for surfing in this area is a shortboard.

Huntington Beach is also a popular destination for kite surfing, and this sport can be viewed on the beach northwest of the pier.

Bicycling
The Huntington Beach bicycle path stretches for  alongside the beach.  Concessionaires offer rentals of various bicycles, tandem bicycles, electric bicycles and surreys.

Kayaking and paddleboarding
Kayaking and standup paddleboarding is a popular activity in Huntington Harbour.  You can enter the harbour from multiple points along PCH north of Warner Ave or from one of the five public "Mother's Beaches" that allows access to the harbour.  There are multiple places to rent kayaks and paddleboards as well as duffy boats.

Golf
There are three golf courses in Huntington Beach.  Meadowlark Golf Club opened in 1922 located on Warner and Graham, features a par-70, 5,609-yard 18-hole golf course as well as a driving range.  Huntington Beach Disc Golf Course opened in 1977 is located in Central Park West, features a par-54 18-hole golf course.  The Huntington Club, formerly known as Seacliff Country Club, is a private country club which among other amenities includes an 6,935-yard 18-hole golf course.

Parks and recreation

Central Park
Huntington Beach has a large central park, known as Huntington Central Park. Central Park is located between Gothard and Edwards Streets to the east and west, and Slater and Ellis Avenues to the north and south. The park is vegetated with xeric (low water use) plants, and inhabited by native wildlife. Thick forests encircling the park are supplemented with Australian trees, particularly Blue Gum Eucalyptus, a high water use plant.

The Huntington Beach Public Library is located in Central Park in a notable building designed by Richard Neutra and Dion Neutra. It houses almost a half-million volumes, as well as a theater, gift shop and fountains. The library was founded as a Carnegie library in 1914, and has been continuously supported by the city and local activists, with new buildings and active branches at Banning, Oak View, Main Street, and Graham. The library has significant local historical materials and has a special genealogical reference collection. It is independent of the state and county library systems.

The park is also home to the Huntington Central Park Equestrian Center, a  facility boarding over 400 horses and operates a  full time riding school at all levels.   Horse rentals to the public, with guided trail rides through the park is also available.

There is also an Adventure Playground, or mud pit, available for kids. It opened in 1974 at the bottom of an abandoned sand quarry and moved several years later to its location near the library. When constructed, it was one of the only authentic adventure playgrounds in California.  Although renovated during 2020 to 2022, the playground is closed because of drought conditions.

The world's second oldest disc golf course is available in the park, as are two small dining areas, a sports complex for adult use, and the Shipley Nature Center.

Bolsa Chica Ecological Reserve

The grounds are one of the top birding spots in the US attracting flocks of birds migrating along the Pacific Flyway between North and South America. The wetlands themselves have been connected with the ocean again, in effort to maintain the previous, unaltered conditions.

Huntington Dog Beach
Huntington Dog Beach is located in the  stretch between 21st and Seapoint streets. This is the only area where dogs are allowed on the beach in Huntington Beach. The Orange County Register consistently names Huntington Dog Beach as the best dog park in Orange County. Some popular events that take place at Dog Beach are Surf City Surf Dog and So Cal Corgi Nation Beach Days. Dog Beach is free to the public.

The Preservation Society of Huntington Dog Beach works to keep the beach clean and safe. This 501(c)3 non-profit organization was founded in 1997 and has five volunteers who serve on the board. The mission of the Preservation Society of Huntington Dog Beach is as follows: "to protect and preserve access to the beach for dogs and their people, as well as to promote responsible dog ownership in order to make our canine companions welcome members of society."

The society receives no public financing as it relies completely on private donations from dog-lovers who value this public good, and it provides many valuable services that minimize the impact of the negative externalities caused by dog waste and unfriendly dogs. Doggie waste bags are provided for free (over 3,000 are used per day during the summer) and dog owners are encouraged to immediately dispose of their dog's waste in one of the many trash cans provided. Additionally, the society organizes a beach cleanup every Sunday. To keep visitors safe, aggressive dogs are not allowed and dogs must be kept under control at all times.

The society also creates positive externalities by providing the public with valuable information on their website, including rules to keep dogs safe, tips for introducing dogs to the beach for the first time, warnings about the danger of dogs drinking ocean water, and information about nearby RV parking and dog-friendly hotels. Prospective visitors should be aware of the policy regarding leashes: "Under existing city ordinance, dogs must remain leashed. However, for the past several years only unleashed, potentially dangerous dogs have been cited or removed." One important exception is that leashes are always required when entering and exiting the park to ensure safety near PCH.

Government

Local government
The following table shows the current and former mayors of Huntington Beach:

Huntington Beach Fire Department 

The Huntington Beach Fire Department provides fire protection and emergency medical services for the city of Huntington Beach, California. In addition to fire services, the HBFD also provides medical transport via a fleet of five ambulances. Each ambulance is staffed by two three-year limited term EMTs and the department transports over 10,000 patients annually.

The Huntington Beach Fire Department was formed as an organization in 1909 with 20 volunteers.  John Tinsley, became the first fire chief. The first fire engine was a 1923 Seagrave purchased in 1922.

The staffing levels vary from just five Marine Safety Officers during the offseason (October to March) to as many as 65 during the summer. The division staffs 30 lifeguard towers along the beach as well as Tower Zero on the Huntington Beach Pier. Members of the Marine Safety division have a wide array of equipment available for their use including 10 Toyota Tacoma patrol trucks, 3 Toyota Tundra patrol trucks, search and rescue SCUBA gear, 3 29-foot Crystaliner twin-engine rescue vessels, 3 Yamaha Waverunners, rigid-hulled inflatable boats and all-terrain vehicles.

The Huntington Beach Fire Department staffs 4-person engines and trucks. All engines are ALS-level staffing with a Fire Captain, Fire Engineer, and two Firefighter Paramedics. Trucks are BLS-level with a Fire Captain, Fire Engineer, and two Firefighter EMT's. USAR 42 is cross-staffed with Truck 42 personnel. HazMat 46 is cross-staffed with Engine 46 personnel. ET41, ET42, ET45, and ET46 are 24-hour ambulances. ET241, ET242, and ET244 are 14-hour ambulances, that only operate during the daytime hours.

Politics
In the Orange County Board of Supervisors, Huntington Beach is in the First District, represented by Republican Andrew Do.

According to the California Secretary of State, as of February 18, 2020, Huntington Beach has 123,048 registered voters. Of those, 49,490 (40%) are registered Republicans, 37,531 (31%) are registered Democrats, and 31,490 (29%) have declined to state a political party/are American Independents/Green.

Education

Public schools
Huntington Beach is the home of Golden West College, which offers two-year associates of arts degrees and transfer programs to four-year universities.

Huntington Beach is in the Huntington Beach Union High School District, which includes:
Edison High School
Huntington Beach High School
Marina High School
Ocean View High School

The district also has an independent study school, Coast High School.

The city has four elementary school districts: Huntington Beach City School District with 9 schools and Ocean View School District with 15. A small part of the city is also served by the Fountain Valley School District and Westminster School District.

Private schools
Grace Lutheran School is a private K–8 school 
Huntington Christian School is a private K–8 school
The Pegasus School, a nationally recognized blue ribbon school

Defunct schools
Brethren Christian Junior/Senior High School was a private independent school with about 400 students living within  of the school. It closed in 2020 after 73 years in operation.
Lycée International de Los Angeles previously had its Orange County campus in Huntington Beach.

Public libraries
There are five public libraries located in the city:
Central Library
Main Street Branch Library
Banning Branch Library
Helen Murphy Branch Library
Oak View Branch Library

Media
The city was featured in the TruTV series Ocean Force: Huntington Beach. The city is mentioned in the Beach Boys song "Surfin' Safari", Jan and Dean's "Surf Route 101", and "Surfer Joe" by The Surfaris.

Live cameras are set up at the Huntington Beach Pier and shown on screens at the California-themed Hollister apparel stores. The store pays the city for the cameras, with the money used to fund marine safety equipment. The cameras are also used by lifeguards.

The public television station KOCE-TV operates from the Golden West College campus, in conjunction with the Golden West College Media Arts program.

The Wave Section of the Orange County Register covers Huntington Beach.

Transportation
Huntington Beach has 1,121 lane miles of public streets and includes facilities managed by Caltrans which supports a balanced transportation system use of all types of vehicular, transit, bicycle and pedestrian activity.

Freeways
Interstate 405 (I-405) runs through the northeastern part of the city with interchanges at Magnolia Street and Beach Boulevard (SR 39); however, most of the city has no immediate access to a freeway. Discussions of long-term planning about extending State Route 57 to I-405 or possibly extending further to Pacific Coast Highway in Huntington Beach were rejected by the city in 2005.

Bus
Bus service is offered through the OCTA which includes nine routes servicing the city.

Demographics
Most Huntington Beach households have at least one car. In 2015, only 2.6 percent of Huntington Beach households lacked a car, which decreased slightly to 2.2 percent in 2016. The national average was 8.7 percent in 2016. Huntington Beach averaged fully two cars per household in 2016, compared to a national average of 1.8.

Notable people
See List of people from Huntington Beach, California.

Safety

Fire protection in Huntington Beach is provided by the Huntington Beach Fire Department. Law enforcement is provided by the Huntington Beach Police Department. Huntington Beach Marine Safety Officers and its seasonal lifeguards are recognized as some of the best in the world with a top-notch safety record. It has an active Community Emergency Response Team training program, that trains citizens as Disaster Service Workers certified by Federal Emergency Management Agency (FEMA) as a part of a free program run by the fire department's Office of Emergency Services.

Emergency services are also provided at State Beach locations. Peace Officers and lifeguards can be found at Bolsa Chica and Huntington State Beach. Such services consist of aquatic rescues, boat rescues, first aid and law enforcement. All services are provided by the State of California, Dept. Parks & Recreation.

In 1926, the Santa Ana River dam failed, and flash-flooded its entire delta. The southern oceanic terminus of this delta is now a settled area of Huntington Beach. The distant dam is still functional, but silting up, which is expected to reduce its storage volume, and therefore its effectiveness at flood-prevention. The flood and dam-endangered areas are protected by a levee, but lenders require expensive flood insurance in the delta. There have been serious discussions to eliminate the need for flood insurance and this requirement has already been waived in some areas and may one day no longer be considered a credible threat.

Since it is a seaside city, Huntington Beach has had tsunami warnings, storm surge (its pier has been rebuilt three times), sewage spills, tornadoes and waterspouts. The cold offshore current prevents hurricanes. The Pier that was rebuilt in the 1990s was engineered to withstand severe storms or earthquakes.

Large fractions of the settled delta are in soil liquefaction zones above known active faults. Most of the local faults are named after city streets.

Many residents (and even city hall) live within sight and sound of active oil extraction and drilling operations. These occasionally spew oil, causing expensive clean-ups. Large parts of the developed land have been contaminated by heavy metals from the water separated from oil.

The local oil has such extreme mercury contamination that metallic mercury is regularly drained from oil pipelines and equipment. Oil operations increase when the price of oil rises. Some oil fields have been approved for development. The worst-polluted areas have been reclaimed as parks. At least one Superfund site, too contaminated to be a park, is at the junction of Magnolia and Hamilton streets, near Edison High School. On October 2, 2021, an oil spill occurred after a pipe burst, sending oil into the ocean and on the beach. The nearby Talbert Wetlands were affected, and the Pacific Airshow had to cancel the planned show for that day to prevent further damage.

Sister cities
Huntington Beach has the following sister city relationships, according to the Huntington Beach Sister City Association:

  Anjo, Aichi Prefecture, Japan
  Manly, New South Wales, Australia (unofficial)

See also

 Historic Wintersburg in Huntington Beach, California
 Largest cities in Southern California
 List of largest California cities by population
 List of United States cities by population

Notes

References

Further reading

External links

 
 Huntington Beach Chamber of Commerce
 Huntington Beach Conference and Visitors Bureau
 Carnegie Libraries' Web Site Entry for Huntington Beach
 Huntington Beach Parade photos and information
 Huntington Beach Historical Information
 

 
1909 establishments in California
Cities in Orange County, California
Incorporated cities and towns in California
Populated coastal places in California
Populated places established in 1909
Populated places on the Santa Ana River
Surfing locations in California